The 2022–23 Columbus Blue Jackets season is the 23rd season for the National Hockey League franchise that was established on June 25, 1997. On March 17, 2023, the Blue Jackets were eliminated from playoff contention after a 7–4 loss to the Anaheim Ducks.

Standings

Divisional standings

Conference standings

Schedule and results

Regular season
The regular season schedule was published on July 6, 2022.

Roster

Transactions
The Blue Jackets have been involved in the following transactions during the 2022–23 season.

Key:

 Contract is entry-level.

 Contract initially takes effect in the 2023-24 season.

Trades

Players acquired

Players lost

Signings

Draft picks

Below are the Columbus Blue Jackets' selections at the 2022 NHL Entry Draft, which was held on July 7 to 8, 2022, at Bell Centre in Montreal.

Notes:
 The Chicago Blackhawks' first-round pick went to the Columbus Blue Jackets as the result of a trade on July 23, 2021, that sent Seth Jones, Tampa Bay's first-round pick in 2021 and a sixth-round pick in 2022 to Chicago in exchange for Adam Boqvist, a first and second-round pick both in 2021 and this pick (being conditional at the time of the trade). The condition – Columbus will receive a first-round pick in 2022 if Chicago does not win either of the two draws in the 2022 Draft Lottery – was converted when the Blackhawks did not win either draw in the 2022 draft lottery on May 10, 2022.
 The Columbus Blue Jackets' third-round pick went to the Winnipeg Jets as the result of a trade on January 23, 2021, that sent Patrik Laine and Jack Roslovic to Columbus in exchange for Pierre-Luc Dubois and this pick.
 The Tampa Bay Lightning's third-round pick went to the Columbus Blue Jackets as the result of a trade on April 10, 2021, that sent Brian Lashoff to Tampa Bay in exchange for a first-round pick in 2021 and this pick.
 The Buffalo Sabres' fifth-round pick went to the Columbus Blue Jackets as the result of a trade on July 8, 2022, that sent a fifth-round pick in 2023 to San Jose in exchange for this pick.
 The Columbus Blue Jackets' fifth-round pick went to the New Jersey Devils as the result of a trade on February 25, 2019, that sent Keith Kinkaid to Columbus in exchange for this pick.
 The Columbus Blue Jackets' sixth-round pick went to the Chicago Blackhawks as the result of a trade on July 23, 2021, that sent Adam Boqvist, a first and second-round pick both in 2021 (12th and 44th overall) and a conditional first-round pick in 2022 to Columbus in exchange for Seth Jones, Tampa Bay's first-round pick in 2021 and this pick.
 The Anaheim Ducks' seventh-round pick went to the Columbus Blue Jackets as the result of a trade on October 7, 2020, that sent a seventh-round pick in 2020 to Anaheim in exchange for this pick (being conditional at the time of the trade). The condition – Columbus will receive a seventh-round pick in 2022 if the pick is available at the time of the selection – was converted when the pick became available after an earlier conditional trade with Edmonton was resolved on April 8, 2021.
 The Columbus Blue Jackets' seventh-round pick went to the Carolina Hurricanes as the result of a trade on February 13, 2021, that sent Gregory Hofmann to Columbus in exchange for this pick.

References

Columbus Blue Jackets

Columbus Blue Jackets seasons
Blue
Blue